Cloud Nine, cloud 9 or cloud nine is a name colloquially given to the state of euphoria, and may refer to:

Books and comics
 Cloud 9 (comics), a Marvel Comics superhero that debuted in Avengers: The Initiative
 Cloud Nine (novel), a 1984 crime novel by James M. Cain
 Cloud 9 (play), a 1979 play by Caryl Churchill

Companies
 CL 9 (Cloud 9), a remote control company
 Cloud9 (service provider), a mobile phone company in the Isle of Man
 Cloud9 IDE, an open source cloud web-based IDE
 CloudNine Communications, a web space / domain company
 Cloud Nine (Shanghai), a 2006 skyscraper and shopping mall in Shanghai
 Cloud Nine Movies, Indian film production and distribution company, based in Chennai
 Cloud9, an American esports organization
 Cloud 9, a popular Zouk Dance community in Brisbane, Australia

Film and television
 "Cloud Nine" (Cow and Chicken), a 1999 television episode of Cow and Chicken
 Cloud 9 (2006 film), Burt Reynolds beach volleyball comedy motion picture
 Cloud 9 (2008 film), German film directed by Andreas Dresen
 Cloud 9 (2014 film), Disney Channel Original Movie
 The Ninth Cloud, 2014 independent film directed by Jane Spencer
 Cloud 9 (Superstore), the setting for the TV series Superstore

Albums
 Cloud Nine (Kygo album), 2016
 Cloud Nine (The Temptations album), 1969
 Cloud 9, a 2013 album by Eric Nam
 Cloud 9 (Nine album), 1996
 Cloud Nine (George Harrison album), 1987, or the title track
 Cloud Nine (Kottonmouth Kings album), 2007
 Cloud 9 The EP, a 2008 EP by Tinchy Stryder

Songs
 "Cloud 9" (Baker Boy song), 2017
 "Cloud 9" (Beach Bunny song), 2020
 "Cloud 9" (Jamiroquai song), 2017
 "Cloud 9" (Ms. Dynamite and Shy FX song), 2013
 "Cloud Nine" (The Temptations song), 1968
 "Cloud Number Nine", a song by Bryan Adams on his 1998 album On a Day Like Today
 "Cloud 9", a song by Sad Lovers & Giants from their 1982 album Epic Garden Music
 "Cloud 9", a song and 2007 mixtape by B.o.B. 
 "Cloud Nine", a song by Owl City from their 2018 album Cinematic 
 "Cloud Nine", a song by Evanescence from their 2006 album The Open Door
 "Cloud 9", a song by Puddle of Mudd from their 2003 album Life on Display
 "Cloud 9", a song by Toploader from their 1999 album Magic Hotel
 "Cloud 9", a song by Maaya Sakamoto on Wolf's Rain Original Soundtrack, Volume 2
 "Cloud 9", a song by Robin Thicke from his 2011 album Love After War
 "Cloud 9", a song by Chamillionaire from his 2013 album Reignfall
 "Cloud Nine", a song by Leigh Nash on her 2006 album Blue on Blue
 "Cloud Nine", a song by Onetwo on their 2007 album Instead
 "Cloud Nine", a 2001 song by Kim Lukas
 "Cloud 9", a song from the 2014 film Cloud 9, on the album Disney Channel Play It Loud
 "Cloud 9", a song by Emarosa from their 2016 album 131
 "Cloud Nine", a song by Ben Howard from his 2009 EP These Waters
 "Cloud 9", a song by the boyband Exo from their 2016 album Ex'Act
 "Cloud Nine", a 2018 song by Mind Against from their album Days Gone
 "Cloud 9", a song by Volbeat from their 2019 album Rewind, Replay, Rebound
 "Cloud 9", a song by Reks from his 2009 album More Grey Hairs
 "Cloud 9", a 2014 single by Itro & Tobu for NoCopyrightSounds
 "Cloud Nine", a song by Machine Girl for the 2022 video-game Neon White

Other uses
 Cloud 9, the surf break in Siargao, the Philippines
 Cloud 9, business class on Ethiopian Airlines
 Cloud Nine (sphere), giant sky-floating tensegrity spheres named by Buckminster Fuller

See also
 Cloud 7, a 1955 album by Tony Bennett